Third Text is a leading peer-reviewed academic journal covering art in a global context. After founder and editor Rasheed Araeen's earlier art magazine Black Phoenix, which started in 1978 and published only three issues, Third Text was launched as a theoretical art journal in 1987. The journal was edited by Jean Fisher (1992–1999), followed by Richard Appignanesi (2008–2015) and Richard Dyer (2015–present).

Contributors
Contributors include prominent scholars of black studies, feminist theory, and politically engaged art criticism, including Stuart Hall, Kobena Mercer, Paul Gilroy, Laura Mulvey, Lucy Lippard, Coco Fusco, Ella Shohat, Griselda Pollock, Claire Bishop, TJ Demos, Gregory Sholette, Olu Oguibe, Julia Bryan-Wilson, Benita Parry, Zeynep Çelik, Boris Groys, Jimmie Durham, Eddie Chambers, and Michael D. Harris.

Relaunch
The journal was relaunched in 2015 with a new group of editors, selected by an independent panel, a new advisory board, and trustees, and it has published a number of guest-edited special issues since its relaunch.

References

Further reading

Rasheed Araeen, Sean Cubitt, Ziauddin Sardar (Eds.), The Third Text Reader on Art, Culture and Theory

External links

Visual art journals
Publications established in 1987
Bimonthly journals
Taylor & Francis academic journals
Multilingual journals